Charles Lyon was a cricketer.

Charles Lyon may also refer to:
Charles Lyon, 6th Earl of Strathmore and Kinghorne (c.1699–1728), Scottish peer
Charles W. Lyon (1887–1960), American attorney
Charles Lyon (sailor) (1915–1987), American sailor

See also
Charlie Lyons, producer and financier
Lyon (disambiguation)